Raising of the Cross (German: Kreuzaufrichtung) is a 1633 painting by the Dutch Golden Age painter Rembrandt in the collection of the Alte Pinakothek. It was painted as part of a "passion" series commissioned in 1633 by Frederick Henry, Prince of Orange. Together with its pendant, The Descent from the Cross, it is one of the rare paintings by Rembrandt with a continuous provenance from the date of completion to today.

Catalogued as Rembrandt 
This painting was documented by Hofstede de Groot in 1915, who wrote:

Before him, Smith wrote in 1836:

See also
 Rembrandt's so-called "study" for this painting, now in Museum Bredius

References

Paintings by Rembrandt
1630s paintings
Rembrandt
Collection of the Alte Pinakothek